State Route 27 (SR 27) is a  state highway in the southeastern part of the U.S. state of Alabama. The southern terminus of the highway is at the Florida state line, where the route serves as a continuation of County Road 185 (CR 185). The northern terminus of the highway is at the intersection with SR 10 at Abbeville.

Route description
Entering Alabama in eastern Geneva County, SR 27 is primarily a two-lane highway. It serves as a connector from the Gulf coast beaches along the Florida Panhandle to major highways such as US 84 and US 231. Between the cities of Geneva and Enterprise, the highway's orientation is generally north-to-south. Upon leaving Enterprise, the highway assumes a northeastward trajectory as it leads into Dale County. East of Ozark, the highway, while still signed as “north” and “south”, assumes an east–west orientation until its terminus at Abbeville, at SR 10.

Major intersections

See also

References

027
Transportation in Geneva County, Alabama
Transportation in Coffee County, Alabama
Transportation in Dale County, Alabama
Transportation in Henry County, Alabama